Thamos, King of Egypt (or King Thamos; in German, Thamos, König in Ägypten) is a play by Tobias Philipp, baron von Gebler, for which, between 1773 and 1780, Wolfgang Amadeus Mozart wrote incidental music, K. 345/336a, of an operatic character.

Early performances 
It is not known for certain whether the music that Mozart composed was performed with the play during his lifetime.  The play's première took place at the Kärntnertortheater in Vienna, probably on 4 April 1774, by which time two choruses had been written.  Performances in Salzburg in 1776 and 1779-80 may have incorporated the orchestral interludes and the three choruses in their final form, respectively.  The music was re-used in 1783 in a different play (set in India, not Egypt), Lanassa, by Karl Martin Plümicke.

Roles 
The only named role in Mozart's music is Sethos, the high priest (baritone).  There are parts for four other soloists (soprano, alto, tenor and bass) and for a chorus of priests and priestesses.

Synopsis
Thamos has succeeded his father, Ramesses, as king of Egypt, but Ramesses had usurped the throne from the rightful king, Menes, who is now disguised as the high priest, Sethos.  Thamos loves Sais, a priestess, but she is really Menes' daughter Tharsis, for whom the high priestess Mirza is plotting marriage to Pheron, a treacherous general.  When Menes reveals his true identity, Pheron is struck by lightning and Mirza kills herself.  Menes cedes his crown to Thamos and Tharsis as all ends happily.

Musical numbers 

Act 1
Chorus: "Schon weichet dir, Sonne" (Maestoso)
Interlude (Maestoso-Allegro)
Act 2
Interlude (Andante)
Act 3
Interlude (Allegro)

Act 4
Interlude (Allegro Vivace Assai)
Act 5
Chorus and soloists: "Gottheit, über alle mächtig!" (Allegro Moderato)
Chorus with solo for Sethos: "Ihr Kinder des Staubes, erzittert"

Recordings 
 Theo Adam, Eberhard Buchner, Karin Eickstaedt, Dietrich Knothe, Gisela Pohl, Hermann Christian Polster, Staatskapelle Berlin, Rundfunk-Solistenvereiningung Berlin, conductor Bernhard Klee.   Philips CD, 422 525.
 Alastair Miles, Angela Kazimierczuk, Paul Tindall, Julian Clarkson, English Baroque Soloists, Monteverdi Choir, conductor: John Eliot Gardiner.  Polygram CD, EAN: 0028943755627.  Also contains  an appendix with Mozart's earlier versions of nos. 1, 6 and 7.
 Diego Fasolis, Coro Della Radio Svizzera, I Barocchisti.  RTSI MultiMedia.
 Laurence Equilbey dirigiert Mozarts Frühwerk
Nikolaus Harnoncourt and Royal Concertgebouw Orchestra on Teldec, probably the finest recording that exists, from 1980. Unfortunately, the spectacular performance from 2004 with Royal Concertgebouw Orchestra and Gerd Böckmann was never released on cd.

See also
List of Mozart's operas

References
Holden, Amanda (Ed.), The New Penguin Opera Guide, New York: Penguin Putnam, 2001. 
Warrack, John and West, Ewan, The Oxford Dictionary of Opera New York: OUP: 1992

External links 
 
 

(Konzertmitschnitt vom 26. Juni 2018, Festival Seine Musicale, Boulogne-Billancourt.)

Operas by Wolfgang Amadeus Mozart
German-language operas
1779 operas
Incidental music
Operas
Operas set in ancient Egypt